Colonel Bailey Kelly Ashford (September 28, 1873 – November 1, 1934) was an American  physician who had a military career in the United States Army, and afterward taught full-time at the School of Tropical Medicine in Puerto Rico, which he helped establish in San Juan.

A pioneering physician in the treatment of anemia, Ashford organized and conducted a parasite treatment campaign against hookworm while stationed in Puerto Rico. This cured approximately 300,000 persons (one-third of the Puerto Rico population) and reduced the death rate from associated anemia by 90 percent. He was a founding member of the Puerto Rico Anemia Commission.

Early years
Ashford was born in Washington D.C. as one of five children in the family of Francis Ashford, a prominent physician, and his wife. His general education was obtained at the public schools and at Columbian University in Washington D.C. (now George Washington University). In 1896, he graduated from the Georgetown University School of Medicine. He served as a resident physician in several area hospitals.

As a recently commissioned lieutenant in the United States Army Medical Corps, Ashford accompanied the military expedition to Puerto Rico in 1898 during the Spanish–American War.

Personal life
Ashford made Puerto Rico his adopted home, marrying a local woman, María López Nussa. They had three children: Mahlon, Margarita, and Gloria María.

Professional life

Hookworm treatment
Serving as the medical officer in the general military hospital in Ponce, Puerto Rico, in 1899 he was the first to describe and successfully treat North American hookworm. He was a tireless clinician and conducted an exhaustive study of the anemia caused by hookworm infestation, which was the leading cause of death and responsible for as many as 12,000 deaths a year. From 1903–1904, together with his colleague Pedro Gutiérrez Igaravídez, he organized and conducted a parasite treatment and education campaign, which treated approximately 300,000 persons (one-third of the Puerto Rico population). This work reduced the death rate from this anemia by 90 percent. Through Ashford's professor, Charles Wardell Stiles, his work also led to the creation of a seminal campaign to fight hookworm in the American South that was funded by John D. Rockefeller.

Anemia treatment
Captain Ashford was a founding member of the Puerto Rico Anemia Commission. By special authority of the Secretary of War, he served on the Commission from 1904–1906.

School of Tropical Medicine
In 1911, his proposal for an Institute of Tropical Medicine (Later renamed School of Tropical Medicine) in Puerto Rico was approved by Antonio R. Barceló, the president of the Puerto Rican Senate. He pushed for passage of the legislation to authorize the school, and Governor Horace Mann Towner and his cabinet proceeded to create it. After serving as a commander of the Army Medical Department's First Division during World War I, Colonel Ashford was assigned to San Juan. He campaigned for the development of "a real school of tropical medicine in the American tropics".

The School of Tropical Medicine of Puerto Rico was formally dedicated in 1925. It was affiliated with Columbia University in New York and became part of the University of Puerto Rico.

After a 30-year Army career as a military doctor, Ashford assumed a full-time faculty position at the School, where he continued his interest in tropical medicine. Together with doctors Isaac González Martínez and Ramón M. Suárez Calderon, he continued to carry out experiments related to anemia. The University of Puerto Rico campus at Rio Piedras, the building of the Institute of Tropical Medicine (see drawings) in Puerta de Tierra, San Juan, is one of the few examples of the Neo-Plateresque architectural style in the Island.

Legacy and honors

In his honor, the main avenue in the San Juan, Puerto Rico district of "El Condado", bears his name as does the Ashford Presbyterian Community Hospital as well as the Ashford Medical Center, also in Condado. His home in Condado is being preserved and renovated.

In 1941, The American Society of Tropical Medicine and Hygiene established the "Bailey K. Ashford Medal". This is awarded for distinguished work in tropical medicine to a worker in his or her early or mid-career. The first person to receive the award was Lloyd E. Rozeboom. The medal is awarded every year, and more than one award may be given.

Ashford died on November 1 1934, in his home in San Juan. His remains were interred in Puerto Rico National Cemetery in the city of Bayamón.

Bibliography
His writings include: Anemia in Puerto Rico published in 1904; Uncinariasis in Puerto Rico published in 1911; and a memoir, A Soldier in Science, published in 1934.

See also

 List of Puerto Ricans

References

External links
 Walter Reed Army Medical Center - Bailey K. Ashford
 Ashford Presbyterian Community Hospital

1873 births
1934 deaths
American male non-fiction writers
American medical academics
American medical writers
American military personnel of the Spanish–American War
Columbian College of Arts and Sciences alumni
Founders of schools in the United States
Georgetown University School of Medicine alumni
Military personnel from Washington, D.C.
People from San Juan, Puerto Rico
People from Washington, D.C.
Physicians from Washington, D.C.
Puerto Rican tropical physicians
United States Army personnel of World War I